Taylor Marie Otto (born October 23, 1997) is an American professional Soccer player who played as a midfielder for Scottish Women's Premier League club Celtic.

It was announced on Sunday the 7th August 2022 that Taylor had signed for Celtic FC, she was put straight into the squad for that days game against Hibs ladies that Fran Alonso's Celtic team won convincingly by 9 goals to nil.

Club career
Born in Cleveland, Ohio, Otto began her career with CASL ECNL before joining the North Carolina Tar Heels of the University of North Carolina at Chapel Hill. She red shirted her first season with the Tar Heels after she participated with the United States under-20 side at the FIFA U-20 Women's World Cup. The next season, in 2017, she became the starting center-back for the Tar Heels, playing all 22 games for the side. After spending four seasons with the Tar Heels, Otto had played 84 matches, scoring 11 goals.

Racing Louisville
On January 13, 2021, Otto was selected first pick of the second round (11th overall) of the NWSL Draft by Racing Louisville. She made her debut for the side on April 15, 2021 in the NWSL Challenge Cup against the Washington Spirit, coming on as a 78th minute substitute in a 1–0 defeat. 

On July 27, 2022, Racing Louisville announced that Otto had mutually terminated her contract with the club to pursue playing opportunities in Europe.

CELTIC FC LADIES 

On August the 7th Taylors move to Europe was confirmed when she signed for Celtic ladies, the woman’s team of the world famous Celtic F.C. in Glasgow , Scotland. The team is managed by Fran Alonso who showed great faith in Taylor by putting her in the squad for her first game on the days she arrived, Celtic ladies ran out convincing 9-0 winners.

Career statistics

Club

References

External links
 Profile at Racing Louisville

1997 births
Living people
American women's soccer players
Women's association football midfielders
North Carolina Tar Heels women's soccer players
Racing Louisville FC players
National Women's Soccer League players
Soccer players from Cleveland
Racing Louisville FC draft picks